The Decline and Fall of Heavenly is the third studio album by British indie pop band Heavenly. It was released in September 1994 by Sarah Records with the catalogue number SARAH 623 (see Sarah Records catalogue). In the United States the album was released by K Records.

Four songs were re-recorded for a John Peel radio session in June 1994: the instrumental "Sacramento"; "Itchy Chin"; "Doomster (Three Star Compartment)"; and "Sperm Meets Egg, So What?".

A Japanese reissue on Quattro added five tracks from two British EPs (also released on one CD by both Sarah and K): "Atta Girl"; "Dig Your Own Grave"; "P.U.N.K. Girl"; "Hearts and Crosses";
and "So".

Reception

EW.com (Entertainment Weekly) states that the music "adds spice with two harmonizing female vocalists sweetly delivering dry, sarcastic lyrics about things like trying to get a lover to leave so you can wake up alone."

From Allmusic: "...a cleanly produced sequence of bouncy, guitar-based pop songs — and fans of the band know just how good they are at writing bouncy pop songs. The only problem with The Decline and Fall is that it's so painfully short."

Track listing
"Me and My Madness"
"Modestic"
"Skipjack"
"Itchy Chin"
"Sacramento"
"Three Star Compartment"
"Sperm Meets Egg, So What?"
"She and Me"

References

Heavenly (British band) albums
1994 albums